Brooke Lee Harris (born 27 August 1997) is an Australian cricketer who plays as a right-arm medium bowler and right-handed batter for the South Australian Scorpions in the Women's National Cricket League (WNCL). Harris is a two-time recipient of the Karen Rolton Medal, the highest honour for women in Australian Premier Cricket. She made her WNCL debut on 16 October 2016 against Tasmania.

References

External links

Brooke Harris at Cricket Australia

1997 births
Australian women cricketers
Cricketers from Adelaide
Living people
South Australian Scorpions cricketers